MetaMaus: A Look Inside a Modern Classic, Maus is a book by Art Spiegelman, published by Random House/Pantheon Books in 2011. The centerpiece of the book is an interview with Art Spiegelman, the author of Maus, conducted by Hillary Chute.  It also has interviews with his wife and children, sketches, photographs, family trees, assorted artwork, and a DVD with video, audio, photos, and an interactive version of Maus. It also has documents such as the letters of rejection Spiegelman received from major publishers before Pantheon gave him a contract.

MetaMaus won a 2011 National Jewish Book Award in the category Biography, Autobiography, Memoir, a 2012 Eisner Award in the category best comics-related book, and an honorable mention in the 2012 Sophy Brody Award.

References

External links
Google Books (US edition)
Google Books (UK edition)
GoodReads

2011 non-fiction books
Comics by Art Spiegelman
Eisner Award winners
Books about the Holocaust
Jewish Polish history
Raw (magazine)
Pantheon Books books